Hans Kiss (born 9 August 1951) is an Austrian wrestler. He competed in the men's Greco-Roman 74 kg at the 1976 Summer Olympics.

References

1951 births
Living people
Austrian male sport wrestlers
Olympic wrestlers of Austria
Wrestlers at the 1976 Summer Olympics
People from Eisenstadt
Sportspeople from Burgenland